Gwyn Hughes Jones (born 25 October 1969) is a Welsh operatic tenor, best known for his leading roles in romantic Italian operatic repertoire.

Early life and education
Gwyn Hughes Jones was born in Llanbedrgoch, Anglesey, Wales, and studied at the Guildhall School of Music and Drama and the National Opera Studio.

Career
Jones began his operatic career at Welsh National Opera in 1995, appearing as Ismaele in Verdi's Nabucco. He has subsequently appeared for WNO in roles such as Cavaradossi in Tosca, Don Alvaro in La forza del destino and Pinkerton in Madam Butterfly. 

In 2011, he appeared as Cavaradossi in Puccini's Tosca directed by Catherine Malfitano for English National Opera. In 2012, he made his debut for the New York Metropolitan Opera as Manrico in Verdi's Il trovatore directed by David McVicar. In 2015, he was cast as Don Alvaro in Verdi's La forza del destino by director Calixto Bieito. In 2016, he was cast as Turiddu in Mascagni's Cavalleria Rusticana by director Elijah Moshinsky.

Recordings

Jones has released three solo albums for Sain Records: Gwyn Hughes Jones - Tenor (1996); Baner Ein Gwlad (1998); and Canu'r Cymry (2011). He appears as Macduff in Verdi's Macbeth for Chandos Records, released in 2014.

References

Living people
People from Anglesey
Welsh operatic tenors
1969 births